Highway 772 is a provincial highway in the Canadian province of Saskatchewan. It runs from Highway 317 near Hoosier to Highway 307 near Smiley. Highway 772 is about 20 km (13 mi.) long.

Highway 772 also passes through the small community of Dewar Lake.

See also 
Roads in Saskatchewan
Transportation in Saskatchewan

References 

772